A total of 25 teams entered the qualification process for the 2012 Caribbean Cup, competing for a total of 8 spots in the final tournament. Jamaica, as the holders, and Antigua and Barbuda, as hosts, qualified automatically, leaving 6 spots open for competition.

Although the qualifying tournament is also part of 2013 CONCACAF Gold Cup qualifying process, the tournament has not been included by FIFA on the FIFA International Match Calendar meaning that the participating nations' first choice players may not be available to play due to club commitments. FIFA allocated 7–11 September and 12–16 October on the FIFA event calendar.

Participants
At the time of the original draw in March 2012, only Sint Maarten and Turks and Caicos Islands had not agreed to participate. In August 2012, the Bahamas, Cayman Islands and the US Virgin Islands pulled out of the competition. Of the five nations to withdraw, three were represented on the Caribbean Football Union executive committee. A total of 25 teams participated in the qualifying phase.

First round
Although a draw was originally made in March 2012, the Caribbean Football Union partner Digicel made changes to the original draw allowing only nations where Digicel services were available to host group games. At the time of the changes, the CFU's contract with Digicel had expired.

Group 1
Held in Haiti.

Group 2
Held in Saint Lucia.

Tiebreakers by head-to-head record:

Group 3
Held in Martinique.

Group 4
Held in Barbados.

Group 5
Held in Saint Kitts and Nevis.

Ranking of second-placed teams
Originally, three positions in the final stage were available to teams who finish in second-place at the group stage. They were to be given to the team that finishes in a higher ranked position between the second-placed teams. The highest ranked second-placed teams between Group 1 and Group 2, Group 3 and Group 4, and Group 5 and Group 6 were to proceed to the final tournament.

However, due to the withdrawals of several nations the qualifying format was revised. Only the runners-up from Group 4 and Group 5 were ranked by the second-placed team format to decide which team progresses to the second round. Runners-up from Groups 1,2 and 3 automatically progressed to the second-round.

Second round
Cuba (third place), Grenada (fourth place) and Guadeloupe (runner-up) have all received byes to the second round for their final position  in the 2010 Caribbean Cup.

Group 6
Held in Grenada.

Group 7
Held in Guadeloupe.

Group 8
Held in Trinidad and Tobago.

Goalscorers
11 goals
 Kévin Parsemain

7 goals

 Gary Pigrée
 Héctor Ramos

6 goals
 Jonathan Faña

5 goals

 Jean-Philippe Peguero
 Jamal Gay

4 goals

 Tyrell Burgess
 Marcel Hernández
 Vurlon Mills
 Steeve Gustan
 Cornelius Stewart
 Stefano Rijssel
 Keon Daniel

3 goals

 Antwan Russell
 Gregory Richardson
 Jean-Eudes Maurice
 Joseph Marrero
 Myron Samuel
 Willis Plaza

2 goals

 Jean-Luc Bergen
 Kurlson Benjamin
 Erick Ozuna
 Jean-Claude Darcheville
 Stanley Ridel
 Larry Clavier
 Dominique Mocka
 Vladimir Pascal
 Shawn Beveney
 Monuma Constant Jr.
 Olrish Saurel
 Stéphane Abaul
 Jordy Delem
 Gaël Germany
 Djenhaël Mainge
 Cédric Sabin
 Marlon Campbell
 Ellis Remy
 Noah Delgado
 Tremain Paul
 Ronny Aloema
 Giovanni Drenthe
 Donovan Loswijk
 Giovanni Waal

1 goal

 Terrence Rogers
 Rensy Barradas
 Raymond Baten
 Frederick Gomez
 Mario Harte
 Barry Skeete
 Rashinda Williams
 Ian Coke
 Taurean Manders
 Lejuan Simmons
 Roberto Linares
 Ariel Martínez
 Christopher Isenia
 Chad Bertrand
 Lester Langlais
 Pedro Antonio Núñez
 Domingo Peralta
 Gilberto Ulloa
 Ludovic Baal
 Marc Edwige
 Kithson Bain
 Clive Murray
 Craig Rocastle
 Loïc Loval
 Walter Moore
 Daniel Wilson
 Jean Sony Alcenat
 Kevin Lafrance
 Alex Balmy
 Jacky Berdix
 Gérald Dondon
 Gaëtan Sidney
 Kendall Allen
 Bradley Woods-Garness
 Darryl Roach
 Cristian Arrieta
 Alex Oikkonen
 Marco Vélez
 Atiba Harris
 Romaine Sawyers
 Tafari Charlemagne
 Eden Charles
 Kurt Frederick
 Cliff Valcin
 Darren Hamlett
 Romano Sordam
 Jurmen Vallei
 Kevon Carter
 Aubrey David
 Ataullah Guerra
 Hughton Hector
 Devorn Jorsling
 Seon Power
 Richard Roy
 Sylvester Teesdale

Own goals
 Jamal Sargeant (scored for Montserrat)
 Anthony Straker (scored for Haiti)
 Colin Nelson (scored for Curaçao)

References

External links
Caribbean Football Union
Results from CONCACAF

Caribbean Cup qualification
Qualification